Isabel Franc (born 1955) is a Spanish writer who signs some of her novels with the pseudonym Lola Van Guardia.

Career
Isabel Franc's works are characterized by humor and being generally focused on the world of female homosexuality. She has also given lectures and writing courses and she has been invited to talk by American universities. Her style combines satire, irony, and parody in a universe where women are the protagonists.

Since 2010 she has been a professor at the  where she teaches courses in writing and humorous literature. She has written as a columnist. She is currently (2018) a regular contributor to La Independent, Agencia de Noticias con Visión de Género (The Independent, News Agency with a Gender Perspective).

Works

Novels
Franc made her literary debut with Entre todas las mujeres (Tusquets, 1992), a  Prize finalist.

She is the author of the celebrated Lola Van Guardia Trilogy, published by Egales, which includes the titles Con Pedigree (1997), Plumas de Doble Filo (1999), and La mansión de las Tríbadas (2002), and has been translated into several languages.

In November 2004 she published No me llames cariño (Egales), that received the Shangay Prize for the best novel of the year.

In 2006 Las razones de Jo (Lumen) was described as "an unusual, funny, and irreverent version of Little Women."

In 2012 Elogio del Happy End (Egales) was the winner of the 6th .

Short stories
Cuentos y fábulas de Lola Van Guardia (Egales, 2008) is a collection of short stories.

Collective works
Franc's collective works include Otras Voces (Egales, 2002), Las chicas con las chicas (Egales, 2008), Noves dames del crim (Llibres del Delicte, 2015), Ábreme con cuidado (Dos Bigotes, 2015), Incidente en el salón (a parody of Natalie Barney's famous salon in the Parisian Rive Gauche in the 1920s), and Donde no puedas amar no te demores (Egales 2016).

Graphic novels
In 2010 she published, along with the cartoonist , Alicia en un mundo real (Norma cómic), a graphic novel about breast cancer, not without its irony, which received the 2011 Jennifer Quiles Award.

In 2014, again in collaboration with Susanna Martín and Norma cómic, Franc published Sansamba, another graphic novel with autobiographical touches, a reflection on cultural and emotional boundaries based on a supposedly impossible friendship.

Essays
Franc's essays include "Del pozo a la hiena: humor e ironía en la llamada literatura lésbica" in the collective volume Cultura, homosexualidad y homofobia. Vol II Amazonia: retos de visibilidad lesbiana (Laertes 2007) and "Envers un Elogi del happy end", in Accions i reinvencions. Cultures lésbiques a la Catalunya del tombant de segle XXI (UOC, 2012).

In 2013 the collective book Desconocidas & Fascinantes (Egales) compiled minibiographies to bring visibility to silenced women.

In 2017, Franc coordinated and edited Las Humoristas. Ensayo poco serio sobre mujeres y humor, published by Icaria. In a humorous tone, the book makes a profound reflection upon the presence and absence of women in the field of humor.

Translation and editing
She translated El jardín de Shahrzad (Egales, 2008) and edited and prefaced the new version of Ladies Almanack by Djuna Barnes (Egales, 2008).

Theater
Franc participated in the theatrical production Yo soy Gloria Fuertes by Gloria Bosch, directed by Ariadna Martí de Puig. She is the author of the play De Generacions, a text for three characters that shows how two generations separated by time understand, live, and express feminism.

Awards
 1992:  Prize finalist
 2004: Shangay Award
 2011: Jennifer Quiles Award
 2011:

References

External links
 Una cómica de la pluma – blog by Isabel Franc

1955 births
20th-century Spanish novelists
20th-century Spanish women writers
21st-century Spanish educators
21st-century Spanish novelists
21st-century Spanish women writers
Spanish women educators
Novelists from Catalonia
Short story writers from Catalonia
Lesbian novelists
Spanish lesbian writers
Spanish LGBT novelists
Living people
Spanish women essayists
Spanish women short story writers
Writers from Barcelona
21st-century women educators
Pseudonymous women writers
20th-century pseudonymous writers
21st-century pseudonymous writers